Singkham Phommalath is a Laotian politician. He is a member of the Lao People's Revolutionary Party. He is a representative of the National Assembly of Laos for Luang Prabang Province (Constituency 6).

References

Members of the National Assembly of Laos
Lao People's Revolutionary Party politicians
Year of birth missing (living people)
Living people
Place of birth missing (living people)